Royal Bavarian Jagdstaffel 35 was a World War I "hunting group" (i.e., fighter squadron) of the Luftstreitkräfte, the air arm of the Imperial German Army during World War I. The unit would score 44 aerial victories during the war, at the expense of six killed in action, four killed in flying accidents, nine wounded in action, five injured in flying accidents, and two taken prisoner of war.

History
Royal Bavarian Jagdstaffel 35 was formed at the FEA 6 training center on 14 December 1916. It went operational by 1 March 1917. It scored its first victory on the same day it lost its first Staffelführer, 14 April 1917. After the death in action of its second CO, subsequent commanders were brought in from outside, Hanstein from Jasta 16 and both Fuchs and Stark from Jasta 77. The squadron disbanded ten days after war's end, on 21 November 1918, at FEA 1 at Schleissheim.

Commanding officers (Staffelführer)

 Herbert Theurich: 4 March 1917 – 14 April 1917 
 Otto Dessloch: 15 April 1917 – 29 June 1917
 Otto Deindl: 29 June 1917 – 21 July 1917
 Otto Dessloch: 22 July 1917 – 24 September 1917
 Ludwig Hanstein: 24 September 1917- 20 January 1918
 Bruno Justinius: 20 January 1918 – 30 January 1918 
 Franz Diemer: 30 January 1918 – 4 March 1918
 Ludwig Hanstein: 4 March 1918 – 21 March 1918 
 Franz Diemer: 21 March 1918 – 21 April 1918
 Otto Fuchs: 21 April 1918 – 7 July 1918
 Rudolf Stark: 7 July 1918 – 28 July 1918
 Gratz: 28 July 1918 – 8 August 1918
 Rudolf Stark: 8 August 1918 – 11 November 1918

Duty stations (airfields)
 Grossenhain, Germany: 7 January 1917 – 1 March 1917
 Colmar Nord: 4 March 1917 – 12 April 1917
 Ensisheim, Germany: 12 April 1917 – 7 May 1917
 Habsheim, Germany: 7 May 1917 – 21 July 1917
 Ichteghem-Vyver: 21 July 1917 – 18 September 1917
 Aertrycke: 18 September 1917 – 30 November 1917
 Prémont, France: 30 November 1917 – 7 February 1918
 Émerchicourt, France: 7 February 1918 – 28 March 1918
 Favreuil, Bapaume: 28 March 1918 – 18 April 1918
 Cambrai – Épinoy Air Base: 18 April 1918 – 28 August 1918
 Lieu-Saint-Amand: 28 August 1918 – 29 September 1918
 Bühl, Saarburg, Germany: 29 September 1918 – 12 October 1918
 Givry, Mons: 12 October 1918 – 29 October 1918
 Gosselies, Charleroi, Belgium: 29 October 1918 – 11 November 1918

Personnel
The squadron had three notable aces serve with it. Rudolf Stark was a winner of the Iron Cross; Ludwig Hanstein won the Royal House Order of Hohenzollern. Fritz Anders also won the Iron Cross.

Aircraft and operations

Aircraft
The new squadron apparently began with new Albatros D.IIIs Later, it must have had at least one Albatros D.V, as Staffelführer Hanstein was flying one when he was killed.

In 1918, the unit upgraded to Fokker D.VIIs, some Pfalz D.XIIs, and some Roland D.Vas.

Operations
Jasta 35 entered its military service on the Armee-Abteilung B Sector in March 1917, and operated there until July. It then transitioned to support of 4th Armee. It stayed with 4th Armee until December; during this time, it became part of Otto Schmidt's Jagdgruppe II along with Jasta 7, Jasta 29, and Jasta 33. In March 1918, Jasta 35 transferred into Jagdgruppe 8 under Eduard Ritter von Schleich, joining Jasta 23, Jasta 32, and Jasta 59; this meant it also transferred to support of 17th Armee. It remained in that support role until September 1918. When Jasta 59 moved out of JG 8 and Jasta 34 moved in, the new Royal Bavarian Jagdgeschwader IV was established; Jasta 35 ended its war with this new unit.

References

Bibliography
 

35
Military units and formations established in 1916
1916 establishments in Germany
Military units and formations disestablished in 1918
Military units and formations of Bavaria